The U.S. state of Iowa official symbols follow, as designated by the Iowa Legislature and listed in the Iowa Official Register:

State symbols

References

Iowa culture
Iowa